John Spence may refer to:

 John Spence (frogman) (1918–2013), American World War II veteran, first American combat frogman
 John Spence (musician) (1969–1987), founding member of the band No Doubt
 John Spence (politician) (1920–1986), British Conservative MP 1970–1986
 John Spence (sailor) (1875–1946), British sailor, won silver medal at 1908 Summer Olympics
 John Spence (scientist) (1929–2013), Trinidadian botanist and politician
 John C. H. Spence (1946–2021), Richard Snell Professor of Physics at Arizona State University
 John S. Spence (1788–1840), American Senator from Maryland
 John Selby Spence (bishop) (1909–1973)
 John David Spence (born 1944), Canadian medical doctor, medical researcher and professor
 John Brodie Spence (c. 1824–1902), banker and politician in South Australia
 John Spence (footballer), footballer for Sunderland
 John Spence (zoo director), South Africa
 John P. Spence (politician) (1905-1981) Ontario politician

See also
 Johnnie Spence (1936–1977), British musical director
 Jonathan Spence (1936–2021), British-born historian
 John Spence Community High School, a secondary school in Preston, Tyne and Wear, England
 John Spencer (disambiguation)